La Croix Fry is a small village contained within the domain of Manigod, Haute-Savoie, France. With a population of under 600, it is a popular site for hill walking on the Plateau de Beauregard as well as skiing in the winter.

It is located in between the large skiing town of La Clusaz and the village of Manigod; the Col de la Croix Fry is on the Tour de France route through the Haute-Savoie department.

References

External links
 "Col of Croix Fry" on en.manigod.com

Villages in Auvergne-Rhône-Alpes